Kilkunda is a panchayat town in The Nilgiris district in the Indian state of Tamil Nadu.

Demographics
 India census, Kilkunda had a population of 10,150. Males constitute 49% of the population and females 51%. Kilkunda has an average literacy rate of 74%, higher than the national average of 59.5%: male literacy is 83%, and female literacy is 66%. In Kilkunda, 9% of the population is under 6 years of age.

References

Cities and towns in Nilgiris district